Jonathan Domínguez (born 19 October 1987) is an Argentine-Chilean former footballer who played as a midfielder.

Club career
In his early career, he was with San Lorenzo, but he was released at the end of 2007 and moved to Chilean side Deportes La Serena on 2008. In 2011, he played for Romanian side FC Brașov.

Personal life
He is of Chilean descent and acquired the Chilean nationality.

Honours
Unión San Felipe
Primera B: 2009
Copa Chile: 2009

References

External links
 
 Jonathan Domínguez at playmakerstats.com

1987 births
Living people
Argentine footballers
Argentine expatriate footballers
Argentine sportspeople of Chilean descent
Citizens of Chile through descent
Chilean footballers
Chilean Primera División players
Primera B de Chile players
Liga I players
Deportes La Serena footballers
Unión San Felipe footballers
Unión La Calera footballers
FC Brașov (1936) players
Coquimbo Unido footballers
Deportes Concepción (Chile) footballers
Deportes Iberia footballers
Expatriate footballers in Chile
Argentine expatriate sportspeople in Chile
Expatriate footballers in Romania
Argentine expatriate sportspeople in Romania
Chilean expatriate sportspeople in Romania
Association football midfielders
Naturalized citizens of Chile
Footballers from Buenos Aires